Abdus Sobhan Golap (born 11 October 1956) is a politician and Member of parliament from Madaripur-3. He is currently serving as the   Publicity and Publications Secretary of the Bangladesh Awami League . He is also a citizen of the United States.

Early life
Golap was born on 11 October 1956 at North Ramjanpur village in Kalkini Upazila, Madaripur District of Bangladesh to Taiyab Ali Mia and Anaran Nesa. He completed his secondary education from Torky Bandor Victory High School and higher secondary from Dhaka College. He obtained his undergraduate degree in Social science from Dhaka University.

In 1983, he was admitted to Norwegian University of Science and Technology at Trondheim and obtained his Masters' from there. Later, he got his PhD from American World University on 'Digital Bangladesh and Social Changes'. The American World University is an uncredited university.

Career
Golap got involved with Bangladesh Chhatra League politics when he was a student of Dhaka University.

Golap accompanied Sheikh Hasina when she went to the United States on 15 March 2007.

When Awami League formed the government after winning the 9th Bangladeshi parliamentary election in 2008, Golap was appointed personal secretary to Prime Minister Sheikh Hasina. In 2014, he was made special assistant to the Prime Minister. He has been the Awami League's office secretary since 2016.

Golap was elected a member of the parliament from Madaripur-3 constituency in the 11th Bangladeshi parliamentary election held on 30 December 2018.

Corruption
The Organized Crime and Corruption Reporting Project in a report has provided credible evidence of corruption against Abdus Sobhan. He acquired no less than nine properties in the United States but did not mention about them in his electoral records before 2018 Bangladesh election. His tax files and other relevant income records also do not have any mention of his properties in New York which indicates foul play in attaining these properties. According to an estimate, the value of these properties are around 4 million USD. He acquired these properties while he was serving as an assistant to Prime Minister Sheikh Hasina.

References

1956 births
Living people
Awami League politicians
11th Jatiya Sangsad members
People from Madaripur District
Dhaka College alumni
American people of Bangladeshi descent
People using unaccredited degrees